ICI or Ici may refer to:

Companies and organisations

 ICI Homes, builder, Florida. US
 Former UK Imperial Chemical Industries
 ICI Australia, later Orica
 Independent Curators International, New York City, US
 Indian Concrete Institute
 Indian Citation Index
, Goutte d'Or district, Paris, France
 Institute of Cultural Inquiry, US art sponsor
 International Colonial Institute, Brussels, Belgium
 International Compact with Iraq, 2007 Iraq-UN
 Investment Company Institute, US
A Woman's Place (bookstore), or Information Center Incorporate

Media
 Ici (magazine) (in French), Montreal, Canada
 Ici Radio-Canada, Canadian Broadcasting Corporation service from 2013
 ICI (TV channel) (International Channel/Canal International), Montreal, Canada

Science and technology
 Interactive Compilation Interface
 Intracervical insemination

Other uses
 NATO Istanbul Cooperation Initiative